Yaykın can refer to:

 Yaykın, Çan
 Yaykın, Karacasu